Amir Kamal Suliman Mohamed (born 24 July 1992) is a Sudanese professional footballer who currently plays as a defender for Al-Merrikh SC.

International career

International goals
Scores and results list Sudan's goal tally first.

Honours

Clubs
Al-Merrikh SC
Sudan Premier League
Champions (5):2013,2015,2018,2018-19,2019-20
Sudan Cup
Winners (5):2012,2013,2014,2015,2018

References

External links 
 

1992 births
Living people
Sudanese footballers
Al-Merrikh SC players
Association football defenders
Sudan international footballers